John Kearns (also Kearnes; 1784–1864) was an Irish-born farmer and political figure in Upper Canada. He represented Prescott in the Legislative Assembly of Upper Canada from 1836 to 1841 as a Conservative.

A Roman Catholic, Kearns received a land grant in Plantagenet Township. Kearns was a lieutenant in the British Army in the 68th (Durham) Regiment of Foot (Light Infantry) who retired on half-pay in 1819 and later served as a captain and then lieutenant-colonel in the Prescott militia. He received a Military General Service Medal with five clasps for service in Europe. He was a justice of the peace for the Ottawa District. Kearns died in Plantagenet Township.

References 

1784 births
1864 deaths
Members of the Legislative Assembly of Upper Canada
68th Regiment of Foot officers
Canadian justices of the peace
Irish emigrants to Canada (before 1923)